Gombyn Zorig (born 20 June 1945) is a Mongolian boxer. He competed in the men's light heavyweight event at the 1972 Summer Olympics. At the 1972 Summer Olympics, he lost in his first fight to Ahmed Mahmoud Aly of Egypt.

References

1945 births
Living people
Mongolian male boxers
Olympic boxers of Mongolia
Boxers at the 1972 Summer Olympics
Place of birth missing (living people)
Light-heavyweight boxers
20th-century Mongolian people